Leif Claesson may refer to:
Leif Claesson (photographer)
Leif Claesson (footballer), Swedish footballer